The R137 road is a road in Dublin, Ireland connecting College Green in the city centre to the junction of the M50 and N81 routes, via Dame Street, Patrick Street, Harold's Cross, Terenure, and Templeogue.

The official definition of the R137 from the Roads Act, 1993 (Classification of Regional Roads) Order, 2012  states:

 R137: Dame Street — Tallaght, County Dublin (Part old National Route 81)

 Between its junction with R138 at Church Lane in the city of Dublin and its junction with M50 at Tymon North in the county of South Dublin via Dame Street, Cork Hill, Lord Edward Street, Christchurch Place, Nicholas Street, Patrick Street, New Street South, Clanbrassil Street Lower, Clanbrassil Street Upper, Harolds Cross Road, Terenure Road North, Terenure Place and Templeogue Road in the city of Dublin: and Templeogue Road and Tallaght Road in the county of South Dublin.

See also
Roads in Ireland
National primary road
National secondary road
Regional road

References

Regional roads in the Republic of Ireland
Roads in County Dublin
Templeogue